DYLA (909 AM) is a radio station owned and operated by Vimcontu Broadcasting Corporation, the broadcast arm of the Visayas-Mindanao Confederation of Trade Unions. The station's studio is located at 2nd Floor, JSU-PSU Mariners' Court-Cebu, ALU-VIMCONTU Welfare Center, Pier 1, Cebu City, and its transmitter is located at Alumnos, Brgy. Mambaling, Cebu City.

History
DYLA started its operation on September 27, 1967. As a news and public affairs radio station, DYLA has been a witness to the history in the Visayas and Mindanao. In living up its thrust as a news and public affairs radio station, it has been regarded consistently as one of the most influential media outlets as far as drawing public opinion on current issues is concerned. It has won virtually numerous news and public affairs awards in each part of the country including the most prestigious Cebu Archdiocesan Mass Media Awards (CAMMA). These include the most coveted best in radio news program twice, best in radio commentary once and again twice in the best in educational programming during the stint of Cerge Remonde as station manager. DYLA has been conferred as the most outstanding institution by the Cebu City government thrice already. DYLA is very strong in live coverages of community affairs. It is in the forefront of calamity coverages. As proof of its credibility in the community, it has raised millions of pesos in public contribution in various disaster relief operations and other causes. While other radio stations give money and goods for people to listen to them, DYLA receives money from its listeners for worthy causes.

Awards
 In 2003, DYLA also won the Best News Program: DYLA BALITA Premier Edition during the 21st CAMMA under the leadership of Jhunnex Napallacan, who was then the news director.
 In 2015, DYLA got the two major awards of the Cebu Archdiocesan Mass Media Awards (CAMMA)--- 2015 Best in Radio News program: Balita sa Alas Siete and 2015 Best in Radio Commentary: Editorial by Jhunnex Napallacan. 
 In September 2017, DYLA again got the CAMMA awards for Balita sa Alas Siete as the Best Radio News Program and Editorial for Best in Radio Commentary.

Former anchors
Leo Lastimosa (Now with Sibya TV)
Cerge Remonde †

References

DYLA
Radio stations established in 1967